Thomas Stack (died 1756) was an English physician and translator. He was elected as a Fellow of the Royal Society in 1751, where he had been foreign secretary from 1748.

He translated the Medica Sacra of Richard Mead from Latin (1755).

Notes

External links
 
 

Year of birth missing
1756 deaths
18th-century English medical doctors
English translators
Fellows of the Royal Society